Heinrich-Droste-Literaturpreis was a literary prize of Germany in 1956.

German literary awards